This is a list of properties and districts in Treutlen County, Georgia that are listed on the National Register of Historic Places (NRHP).

Current listings

|}

References

Treutlen
Treutlen County, Georgia